The flag of Vologda Oblast, a federal subject of Russia, was adopted 26 November 1997.  The flag is a field of white, with a red vertical band on the fly.  A charge of the Vologdan seal is in the upper hoist corner.  The seal is red, with a hand emerging from a cloud, holding an orb and a sword.  A crown floats over the hand.  The ratio of the flag is 2:3.

References

Flags of the World

Flag of Vologda Oblast
Flags of the federal subjects of Russia
Flags introduced in 1997